The following article is a summary of the 2017–18 football season in Cyprus, which is the 76th season of competitive football in the country and runs from August 2017 to May 2018.

League tables

Cypriot First Division

Regular season

Play-offs

Cypriot Second Division

Cypriot Third Division

STOK Elite Division

2018 FIFA World Cup qualifiers

References

 
Seasons in Cypriot football